Timothy Robert Hummel (born November 18, 1978 in Goshen, New York) is a former Major League Baseball player who played for the Cincinnati Reds in  and . He was drafted by the Chicago White Sox in the 2nd round of the 2000 Major League Baseball Draft and made his debut with the Cincinnati Reds on August 26, 2003.

Amateur career
Hummel was drafted out of high school in the 5th round of the 1997 Major League Baseball Draft by the San Diego Padres, but did not sign, opting to attend Old Dominion University. In 1998 he played collegiate summer baseball with the Bourne Braves of the Cape Cod Baseball League, and returned to the league in 1999 and was named a league all-star for the Orleans Cardinals.

Professional career
Hummel was selected in the by the Chicago White Sox in the 2nd round of the 2000 MLB Draft.

He made his debut for the Reds on August 26 and hit .226 in 84 at-bats. In 2004, he batted .218 in 110 at-bats and was selected off waivers by the Boston Red Sox on September 3. In , Hummel played 64 games for Triple-A Pawtucket before being sent to the St. Louis Cardinals on June 22 as part of a conditional deal. He was taken in the 2005 rule 5 draft by his original team, the White Sox.

Personal
A former instructor at Frozen Ropes, a noted chain of training centers for aspiring baseball players, and former Director of 7 City Sports, Hummel is now the varsity Cape Henry Collegiate Baseball coach.  In 2012, Tim assumed the role of Director of Auxilorary Programs at Cape Henry.

In 2011 the 7 City owners - BJ Upton, Justin Upton, and Michael Cuddyer - agreed with Tim to pursue other opportunities.

References

External links

New York Yankees players
Baseball players from New York (state)
Major League Baseball infielders
1978 births
Living people
Burlington Bees players
Winston-Salem Warthogs players
Birmingham Barons players
Charlotte Knights players
Louisville Bats players
Pawtucket Red Sox players
Memphis Redbirds players
Bourne Braves players
Orleans Firebirds players
Old Dominion Monarchs baseball players
People from Goshen, New York
All-American college baseball players